Suter is a surname. Notable people with the name include:
 Alexis P. Suter (born 1963), American blues, and soul blues singer and songwriter
 Andrew Burn Suter (1830–1895), Bishop of the Diocese of Nelson, New Zealand
 August Suter (1887–1965), Swiss sculptor
 Bob Suter (born 1957), American ice hockey defenceman
 Bob Suter (Australian footballer) (1928–2016), Australian rules footballer
 Bob Suter (English footballer) (1880–1945), English footballer
 Brent Suter (born 1989), American baseball player
 Corinne Suter (born 1994), Swiss Alpine skier
 Eskil Suter, Swiss motorcycle road racer and chassis constructor
 Fabienne Suter (born 1985), Swiss Alpine skier
 Fergus Suter (1857–1916), Scottish stonemason and footballer
 Gary Suter (born 1964), American ice hockey player
 Heinrich Suter (1848–1922), Swiss historian of science
 Heiri Suter (1899–1978), Swiss road racing cyclist
 Henry Suter (1841–1918), New Zealand zoologist, naturalist and paleontologist
 Hermann Suter (1870–1926) Swiss composer and conductor
 Keith Suter, Australian strategic planning consultant and futurist
 Jasmina Suter (born 1995), Swiss alpine skier
 Juliana Suter (born 1998), Swiss Alpine skier
 Johann Rudolf Suter (1766–1827), Swiss physician, botanist and philologist
 Martin Suter (born 1948), Swiss author
 Patric Suter (born 1977), Swiss hammer thrower
 Pius Suter (born 1996), Swiss ice hockey player
 Ryan Suter (born 1985), American  ice hockey defenceman
 Steve Suter (born 1982), American college football wide receiver
 William Suter (born 1937), American jurist

See also
 Souter, surname
 Suder, surname

Surnames